Mousa Al-Tarjami (born February 8, 1991) is a Saudi football player who plays a midfielder for Al-Dahab.

References

1991 births
Living people
Saudi Arabian footballers
Al-Raed FC players
Ohod Club players
Hajer FC players
Al-Ansar FC (Medina) players
Al-Arabi SC (Saudi Arabia) players
Al-Washm Club players
Al-Dahab Club players
Saudi Professional League players
Saudi First Division League players
Saudi Second Division players
Saudi Third Division players
Association football midfielders